Bhairavi is a Hindu goddess, described as one of the Mahāvidyas, the ten avatars of the mother goddess. She is the consort of Dakṣiṇāmūrti.

Etymology 
The name Bhairavi means "terror" or "awe-inspiring". She is the fifth of ten Mahāvidyas. She is also called Tripurabhairavi. "Tri" means three, "Pura" means fortress, castle, city, town, etc. Tripura convey three different stages of consciousness i.e. active, dream and deep sleep. She is in the form of all triads and once these triads are transcended, it is believed that Brahman is attained. Hence, she is called Tripurabhairavi.

Iconography

Her dhyana shloka in the Devi Mahatmya describes her form. She is seated on a lotus with four hands, one with a book, one with rosary beads, one with abhaya mudra and another with varada mudra. She wears red garments and wears a garland of severed heads around her neck. She has three eyes and her head is adorned with a crescent moon. In another form she is carrying a sword and a cup containing blood and other two hands showing abhaya and varada mudras. She is also depicted as sitting on Shiva, which is more predominant in tantric worship. She is also depicted as a queen, closely resembling Rajarajeswari.
Tripurabhairavī is said to be residing in muladhara chakra. Her mantra consists of three letters and they all form an inverted triangle in the centre of muladhara chakra. She is the creator in muladhara chakra in the form of kamarupa, which consists of three dots forming an inverted triangle, from which all triads are born, which ultimately leads to the creation of this universe. The innermost triangle of muladhara chakra is known as kamarupa. The three points of triangle have three bijaksaras (sacred letters) and the three bijaksaras connected to each other by the sides of the triangle and each of these sides represent iccha sakthi, jnana sakthi and kriya sakti or the Divine will, Divine knowledge and Divine action. Tripura Sundari and Tripura Bhairavi are closely associated but different. Tripura Bhairavi is posited as the latent energy whereas Tripura Sundarī who causes this latent energy to actualize and moves this energy upwards towards higher chakras till Sahasrara Chakra.

Legend
Bhairavi is also a title for a female adept in Kundalini, Tantra. A yogini is a student of Tantra or an aspirant. A Bhairavi is one who has succeeded. Bhairavi is the consort of Bhairava according to the Puranas and Tantras. 

She is seen mainly as Kalaratri in Durga Saptashati who slays Chanda, Munda and  Raktabija. She slays Bhandasura in the Mahabharata.  

She is also called as Shubhankari, which means that she is the doer of auspicious deeds to her devotees who are her children, which means she is a good mother. She also favors violence, punishment and bloodshed to those who are irreligious and cruel, which also means that she is the mother of all violence to them. She is said to be seen as violent and terrible but is a benign mother to her children.

See also
Devi
Mahakali
Mahavidya
Bhramari

Notes

References
 Kinsley, David (1988). Hindu Goddesses: Vision of the Divine Feminine in the Hindu Religious Traditions. University of California Press. .
 
 R. D. Trivedi: Iconography of Parvati (Delhi, 1981)

Hindu goddesses
Forms of Parvati
Mahavidyas